Phosphoryl nitride in chemistry is a reactive intermediate with the structure OPN. It is a linear oxygen phosphorus nitrogen molecule with a formal double bond between P and O (phosphoryl) and a triple bond (nitride) between P and N. It can be obtained in argon matrix isolation at 16 K by laser photolysis of phosphoryl triazide, OP(N3)3. OPN and its isomer ONP can interconvert by photoisomerization.

References

Inorganic phosphorus compounds
Nitrides
Oxides